Hälleforsnäs IF is a sports club in Hälleforsnäs, Sweden. Once known for its bandy successes, the club now plays floorball and soccer. The club was established in 1925 and played 21 seasons in the Swedish men's bandy top division. and reached the semifinals during the season of 1978–1979, the semifinal game series losing to Brobergs IF.

On 29 August 2005, it was announced that the bandy activity would be disestablished.

References

External links
Floorball section 
Soccer section 

1925 establishments in Sweden
Defunct bandy clubs in Sweden
Football clubs in Södermanland County
Sport in Södermanland County
Association football clubs established in 1925
Bandy clubs established in 1925
Swedish floorball teams